Three Palms for Two Punks and a Babe (Serbian: Tri palme za dve bitange i ribicu) is a 1998 Serbian comedy film directed by Radivoje Andrić.

Cast 
 Srđan Todorović - Lane 
 Dubravka Mijatović - Nadica
 Goran Radaković - Moma
 Milorad Mandić - Terza
 Mirjana Karanović - Direktorka
 Gorica Popović - Tetka
 Marko Janketić - Mali
 Nenad Jezdić - Pendula

References

External links 

Serbian comedy films
1998 comedy films
1998 films
Films set in Serbia
Films set in Yugoslavia
Yugoslav comedy films
1990s Serbian-language films